Our Final Hour is a 2003 book by the British Astronomer Royal Sir Martin Rees. The full title of the book is Our Final Hour: A Scientist's Warning: How Terror, Error, and Environmental Disaster Threaten Humankind's Future In This Century—On Earth and Beyond. It was published in the United Kingdom under the title Our Final Century: Will the Human Race Survive the Twenty-first Century?.

The premise of the book is that the Earth and human survival are in far greater danger from the potential effects of modern technology than is commonly realised, and that the 21st century may be a critical moment in history when humanity's fate is decided. Rees discusses a range of existential risks confronting humanity, and estimates that the probability of extinction before 2100 CE is around 50 percent, based on the possibility of malign or accidental release of destructive technology.

Humanity's fate and recommendations for survival
In Our Final Hour, Rees predicts that one of the two following outcomes is inevitable for humanity:

 Human extinction, as a result of the runaway effects of new technology (e.g. nanotechnology), Superconducting Super Collider type large scale particle accelerators, or uncontrolled scientific research; terrorist or fundamentalist violence; or destruction of the biosphere; or
 Human expansion throughout space, by minimising, avoiding or overcoming these problems.

In order to avoid human extinction, Rees advocates control of scientific research worldwide, and control of open access to such research. He states that, in the 1990s, Aum Shinrikyo tried unsuccessfully to obtain an Ebola virus sample, which they could now create in their Mount Fuji lab, using ingredients and instructions from the Internet.

Rees has long been active in disarmament campaigns, and although he now sees nuclear warfare as a less probable cause of extinction, he advocates arms control as much as control of science and technology (see also World government). More concerning to him now is the possibility of major bioterrorist attacks, as evidenced by his outstanding bet (registered with the Long Bet Project) that such events will occur within the next twenty years.

Rees advocates free market-based options for space exploration and survival through colonization, and believes that the wealthy will push back the frontiers of space.

Reviews
 Review by Oliver Morton in The Guardian — Morton believes that Rees's 50% chance of extinction is too high and states that "defences against bioterror will evolve in step with the threat. It is entirely conceivable that there will be no last move, and no final 'game over'".
 Review by The Telegraph
 Review by BBC News
 Review by Publishers Weekly
 Review by John Derbyshire in The National Review — Derbyshire is convinced by Rees's argument and considers that human extinction does not seem improbable.
 Review by The Universe Today which finds the book "makes some well-reasoned arguments about the dangers of scientific exploration" but is "short on solutions that could help guide policy".
 http://canadiancor.com/final-century-will-human-race-survive-twenty-first-century/  Review by Steven B Kurtz, in FUTURES,    doi.org/10.1016/j.futures.2004.03.016   Kurtz largely agrees with Rees, but balks at the implied Anthropic Principle.

Further reading
Rees does not object to the probabilistic argument for human extinction offered by the Doomsday argument (as championed by John Leslie in the 1996 book The End of the World: The Science and Ethics of Human Extinction (Routledge, hardcover: ,)), but he does not consider it to describe the practical threats and solutions that he discusses.
In The Singularity is Near, Raymond Kurzweil reaches the same conclusion as Rees on the probability of human extinction within the 21st century.
In the 2004 book Collapse: How Societies Choose to Fail or Succeed (Viking Adult), Jared Diamond suggests that Sir Martin's hopes of worldwide cooperation in avoiding extinction scenarios may be in vain.
Ronald Wright, who quotes Martin Rees with approval in A Short History of Progress (at p. 125–6), is just as pessimistic – much more so than Jared Diamond – and argues that human history reveals a disastrous series of technological progress traps.

See also
 Apocalypse
 Eschatology
 End of civilization
 Extinction
 Fermi paradox
 Human extinction
 Millenarianism
 Precautionary principle
 Societal collapse
 Superconducting Super Collider
 Technological singularity

Publication data
Sir Martin Rees, Our Final Hour: A Scientist's Warning: How Terror, Error, and Environmental Disaster Threaten Humankind's Future In This Century—On Earth and Beyond (2003), Basic Books, hardcover: , 2004 paperback: 
Sir Martin Rees, Our Final Century?: Will the Human Race Survive the Twenty-first Century? (2003) (UK) William Heinemann, hardcover: , 2004 Arrow paperback:

External links
 Rees's bet on a major bioterrorist attack at longbet.com
 "Martin Rees asks: Is this our final century?" (Video of talk from 2005)

Futurology books
2003 non-fiction books
Books about existential risk
Basic Books books